Darreh Sir (also Romanized as Darreh Sīr and Darrahsīr) is a village in Pishkuh Rural District, in the Central District of Taft County, Yazd Province, Iran. At the 2006 census, its population was 18, in 7 families.

References 

Populated places in Taft County